Price Street is a prominent street  in Savannah, Georgia, United States. The street's directional flow is one-way (southbound), with a single lane for motor vehicles and a dedicated lane for cyclists. Its northern section passes through the Savannah Historic District, a National Historic Landmark District.

Price Street runs beside seven squares. From north to south:

To the west of
Washington Square
Greene Square
Crawford Square

To the east of
Warren Square
Columbia Square 
Troup Square 
Whitefield Square

Notable buildings and structures

Below is a selection of notable buildings and structures on Price Street, all in Savannah's Historic District. From north to south:

D. D. Williams House, 12 Price Street (1816)
William Williams House, 16 Price Street (by 1809)
Elizabeth Heery House, 17 Price Street (1857)
William Wescott House, 36 Price Street (1874)
Stephen Timmons Cottage, 40 Price Street (1841) – has also been Tommie's Place delicatessen
Frederick Heineman Property, 140 Price Street
146–148 Price Street (between 1890 and 1898)
150–152 Price Street (1890)
Stewart Austin Row House, 234–244 Price Street (1855)
322–328 Price Street (1870)
Silas Fulton Property, 408–410 Price Street (1860)
Frederick Wessels Row House, 411–419 Price Street (1876)
Henry Sulter Row House, 422–428 Price Street (1881)
Martin Sulter Duplex, 436–438 Price Street (1888)
Cord Asendorf Property, 443–447 Price Street (1892)
McMillan Brothers Property, 506–508 Price Street (1893)
524–534 Price Street (1893)
Frederick Wessels Duplex (I), 607–609 Price Street (1891)
Frederick Wessels Duplex (II), 615–617 Price Street (1892)

References

Roads in Savannah, Georgia
Streets in Georgia (U.S. state)